Liberal Science Institute (often abbreviated as LIFO) is a Norwegian libertarian organisation that was established in 1988. It does not organise any activity itself, but it gives financial support to the market liberal think-tanks Civita and Liberal Laboratory Foundation, as well as the liberal conservative periodical Minerva.

References

External links
 

1988 establishments in Norway
Organizations established in 1988
Political organisations based in Norway
Libertarian organizations